Charlton Mackrell railway station was a minor railway station serving the village of Charlton Mackrell in Somerset, England, from 1905 until 1962.

History 
The station was on the Langport and Castle Cary Railway of the Great Western Railway, and was a temporary terminus station for the railway (serving trains from Castle Cary) before it was finished in 1906.

The station master's house is still in use as private property.

Though the station closed along with the rest of the stops between Castle Cary and Cogload Junction in 1962, the line itself is still in use as part of the Reading to Taunton line.

Services

References 

Disused railway stations in Somerset
Railway stations in Great Britain opened in 1905
Railway stations in Great Britain closed in 1962
Former Great Western Railway stations